United Kingdom intellectual property law is a part of English property law which concerns the rights of intangible but valuable information or rights. It covers in particular,

United Kingdom trade mark law
Copyright law of the United Kingdom
United Kingdom patent law

See also
English land law
English trusts law

References

 
English property law